DYUP 873 AM is a music, news and non-commercial educational AM college radio station operating in Miagao, Iloilo. The radio format of the station is for student information, entertainment, technology transfer, news and music. This also serves as training ground for Broadcasting and Communication students.

See also 
 DYUP-FM
 DZUP

Radio stations in Iloilo
University of the Philippines Visayas
Radio stations established in 1964
College radio stations in the Philippines